The Woodside railway line was a country branch line, in Victoria, Australia. It opened in three stages from 1921 to 1923. Most of the line was closed in 1953, with the remaining section to Yarram continuing in use until 1987.

History
The Woodside Line branched off the former South Gippsland line, or Great Southern Railway, at Alberton station. One of the last major branch lines to be constructed in Victoria, it opened in three stages. The first, from Alberton to Yarram, opened on 8 February 1921, the second stage, to Won Wron, on 16 December 1921, and the third stage, on 22 June 1923, to Woodside. The line was well known for its sharp curves and spectacular scenery. It was also one of the last in Victoria to feature a mixed passenger and goods service.

The branch continued in its initial configuration until 25 May 1953 when it was closed from Yarram to Woodside. The section of the branch to Yarram remained open until 26 October 1987, after which it, and part of the main line, was closed back to Welshpool.

A 6 km section of the former branch, from Alberton to Yarram, has become the Tarra Rail Trail.

References

See also
List of closed regional railway stations in Victoria
Transportation in Australia

Closed regional railway lines in Victoria (Australia)
Railway lines opened in 1921
Transport in Gippsland (region)
Shire of Wellington